Ngan Shing-kwan,  (1900 or 1903 – 14 April 2001), born in Hong Kong, was a notable Hong Kong transport and later property tycoon that ran China Motor Bus. 

Ngan got his start running his uncle's rickshaw service during the 1920s in Kowloon. Such was Ngan's reputation in the rickshaw industry that according to one interview "[s]top any rickshaw puller on the street and he would nod knowingly at the nearest mention of Ngan Shing Kwan's [sic] name." This success within the rickshaw industry attracted the attention of the government and Ngan won the first exclusive licence to operate a bus service in Hong Kong in 1933. 

Ngan established himself on the Hong Kong business scene via a frugal attitude during the early days of China Motor Bus. The Company owned many strategic bus depots and properties, which were subsequently redeveloped for commercial, residential and industrial use at great profit.  Ngan Shing-kwan thrived by sticking to two simple principles: devotion to the buses and counting the pennies. In fact, it was Ngan that was instrumental in bringing the iconic double-decker bus to Hong Kong.

Ngan Shing-kwan remained Chairman of CMB until his death, when his daughter Irene, a director since 1968, became Chairman and Managing Director. His other children Henry (a medical doctor) and Horace served as directors. Horace acquired or claimed the English titles "Baron of Appleby" and "Viscount", both of unknown provenance.

However, by the early 1990s and after Ngan Shing-kwan's retirement from day-to-day operations, the Company began to fall behind its competitors Citybus and Kowloon Motor Bus. Ngan Shing-kwan's children incorrectly wagered that frugal Hong Kong customers would not pay a premium for air conditioned buses. The Company's frugality, once a virtue, had now become a liability. Even though CMB was a Hong Kong Stock Exchange listed Company, annual general meetings were often held in a depot and once inside a hospital. Finally, in 1998, despite owning a fleet of more than 800 buses, having 2,400 employees and a turnover of HKD$800 million, the Hong Kong government pulled CMB's licence, citing poor performance. At the time CMB's licence was pulled just 20% of their fleet was air conditioned, versus their competitors which had approximately 80%. 

Ngan was a high profile member of Hong Kong's public sector. In addition to his role at China Motor Bus Co. Ltd, he was the first chairman of the Tung Wah Hospital's and the Po Leung Kuk (Society for the Protection of Women and Children). Ngan was also a member of Hong Kong's Legislative Council (1951–1961) and the Executive Council (1959–1961), until he was succeeded by Douglas Clague on 28 May 1961. In the New Year Honours 1961 Shing-kwan was appointed as a CBE for public services in Hong Kong. Ngan was also an influential figure within the Chiu Chow Chamber of Commerce since the 1930s and was known to be a devout Christian and trustee of Hop Yat Churches in Kowloon (since 1957), North Point (since 1984) and Ma On Shan (since 1997). 

He died in April 2001 at the age of 98 or 100/101 if his age on shipping manifests of 47 in 1947 and 50 in 1950 is correct.

References

1900s births
2001 deaths
Hong Kong businesspeople
Chinese Taipei national football team managers
Hong Kong collaborators with Imperial Japan
Members of the Legislative Council of Hong Kong